The Fehmarnbelt Lightship was built in 1906–1908 at Brake on the River Weser and entered service in 1908 as the lightship Außeneider. Until 1945 it was moored at the position known as Außeneider guarding the estuary of the river Eider on the North Sea coast. In the years from 1956 to 1965 it was a reserve lighthouse in the Baltic Sea and then from 1965 to 1984 it was positioned under its present name in the Fehmarn Belt.

The ship is preserved in working condition and during the summer it is taken to sea in order to test all facilities under sea conditions. Visits on board the lightship are permitted.

References

External links

 Page of the Lightships of Lübeck Society

Museum ships in Germany
Lübeck
Lightships
20th century in Schleswig-Holstein
Port of Lübeck